Matthew Charles Berry (born 2 May 1974) is an English actor, comedian, musician, and writer. He is best known for his roles in comedy series such as The IT Crowd, Garth Marenghi's Darkplace, The Mighty Boosh, Snuff Box, What We Do in the Shadows, and Toast of London, the last of which he also co-created. The series earned him the 2015 BAFTA Award for Best Male Performance in a Comedy Programme. As a musician, he has released nine studio albums.

Early life
Matthew Charles Berry was born on 2 May 1974 in Bromham, Bedfordshire, the son of nurse Pauline (née Acreman) and taxi driver Charles Berry. He attended Nottingham Trent University, graduating in 1999 with a BA in contemporary arts.

Career

Film and television
Berry began his career as a runner. Between 1998 and 1999, he appeared in the video game magazine show Game Over on BSkyB's computer and technology channel .tv. The episodes contained a large number of comedy sketches with Berry as the main performer.

Berry's first prominent television role was Todd Rivers/Lucien Sanchez in the cult 2004 comedy series Garth Marenghi's Darkplace and its 2006 spin-off, Man to Man with Dean Learner. He later appeared as eccentric, sinister tycoon Dixon Bainbridge in The Mighty Boosh. He met The Mighty Boosh duo while performing at the Hen and Chickens Theatre, where they were resident in 2000. He can be seen in a cameo performance in The Mighty Boosh Live DVD.

After meeting Rich Fulcher while filming The Mighty Boosh, Berry wrote and starred in the comedy series Snuff Box with him on BBC Three. Fulcher had co-starred as Bainbridge's lackey, Bob Fossil in The Mighty Boosh. Berry also starred with Fulcher and Simon Farnaby on E4's The Golf War in November 2007.

In 2007, Berry joined The IT Crowd during its second series as Douglas Reynholm. He was nominated as Best Male Comedy Newcomer in the 2007 British Comedy Awards for the role.

In 2008, he became the face of Adult Swim's spoof charity appeal "Save the Workers".

In 2010, Berry played journalist Michael Duffy in the BBC production Five Daughters, about events surrounding the Ipswich murders of 2006. In 2011, he provided the voice of Allen in the Aqua Teen Hunger Force episode "Allen Part Two". He appeared in the British comedy panel game Shooting Stars, portraying Vangelis. He also appeared as an antiques expert in the ITV sketch show Monkey Trousers with Vic and Bob and Steve Coogan.

Berry also appeared in a number of films during this period, including The Devil's Chair (2006) and Moon (2009). He also starred in The Search (2009), a short film about "a lonely man's search for the existence of life outside our universe takes a remarkable turn when he connects with a recently bereaved family".

In 2012, BBC Radio 4 aired his comedy series I, Regress, where he portrayed Dr. Berry, a brilliant but unorthodox regressive therapist. In each 15-minute episode, Berry explored the psyche of a guest patient, attempting to treat his or her problems in surreal dreamlike sequences. Berry appeared in the film adaptation of the David Nicholls novel One Day as Aaron, Dexter's agent. He was briefly featured in the closing ceremony of the London 2012 Olympics, introducing ELO's "Mr. Blue Sky" by way of a mock weather forecast.

In July 2012, he appeared as vainglorious actor Steven Toast in the pilot episode of Channel 4 sitcom Toast of London, co-written with Arthur Mathews. Notwithstanding mixed reviews, a series was commissioned, and the first episode was broadcast on 20 October 2013, and it brought Berry the 2015 BAFTA Award for Best Male Comedy Performance. In 2015, Berry and Arthur Mathews published Toast on Toast: Cautionary Tales and Candid Advice, a spoof autobiography of Steven Toast. It was also released as an audiobook read by Berry.

Berry played the title character in the 2013 Portlandia episode "Squiggleman". Co-creators Fred Armisen and Carrie Brownstein included the appearance on a list of their "proudest musical moments" from the show.

From 2014 to 2015, Berry co-starred in the BBC 2 series House of Fools, written by and starring Reeves and Mortimer. He portrayed Beef, "the highly sexual, flamboyant and blindly confident friend of Vic and Bob" who "will seduce anything in a skirt".

Berry appeared in episode nine of the sixth season of Dan Harmon's television series Community, released on Yahoo Screen on 5 May 2015. In December 2015, he played Professor Awfulshirt in Harry Hill in Professor Branestawm Returns on BBC One.

Since 2019, Berry has starred in the FX TV adaptation of the film What We Do in the Shadows as Laszlo, one of four vampires living in Staten Island. It was renewed for a second season in May 2019, and began airing in April 2020. The third season aired September 2021. In an interview with collider.com, Berry said, "It's different and it's very free. The scripts are starting points and then we go from there. That's how I like to work, anyway. So, for me, it was perfect. That's my background, improvisation. It was home for me in that department."

In 2019, Berry also starred in the IFC/Channel 4 sitcom Year of the Rabbit. Set in Victorian London, he plays the alcoholic Detective Inspector Rabbit. On 11 February 2020, the series was renewed for a second series of six episodes. Citing budget cuts caused by the COVID-19 pandemic, Channel 4 reversed their decision in January 2021, casting doubt on the show's future. Layla Smith, chief executive of the show's production company OMG, stated, "Year of the Rabbit is a victim of the devastating effects of COVID. [...] IFC are very committed to the show, but we will need to find another partner — and we're working on that."

In April 2020, BBC Two commissioned Berry for a mockumentary series titled Squeamish About ... The four quarter-hour specials will be co-written by Berry and Arthur Mathews, and star Berry as Michael Squeamish. The series uses a combination of archive footage and voiceover to produce a surreal perspective on the episodes' subject.

In 2021, after the second series of Year of the Rabbit was axed, Berry was commissioned by the BBC to make a "Steven Toast in America" series for them. The show was a six-part television programme for BBC One, broadcast under the title Toast of Tinseltown and co-written by Berry and Arthur Mathews.

Voiceovers

Berry also took on a number of voice acting roles. He voiced Bubbles, an inter-dimensional dolphin, in the 2015 SpongeBob SquarePants film sequel, The SpongeBob Movie: Sponge Out of Water. That year, he also voiced the main villainess, The Butt Witch, in Twelve Forever, a series pilot created by Julia Vickerman for Cartoon Network that was released on their website on 18 May 2015. The show was moved to Netflix in December 2017. From 2015 to 2016, Berry narrated Matt Berry Does ..., a series of comedy shorts for the BBC. He provided the voice of Prince Merkimer in Matt Groening's animated series Disenchantment, which premiered in 2018 on Netflix.
Berry's distinctive voice has seen him providing many voiceovers for both radio and television advertising, including Absolute Radio, Müller Corner adverts and characters on several adverts for The Natural Confectionery Company. He has also been in the sketch show The Wrong Door as a recurring bit-part character who runs into a snooker hall and shouts "Stop playing snooker!" before whispering an implied impossible wager to one of the players and completing an unfeasible trick shot. In 2012, he worked with Team17 on their video game title Worms Revolution, providing voiceover, as fictional wildlife documentary maker Don Keystone, for both the game and the video advertisements produced for it.

In 2014, Berry read out the teamsheets at Luton Town before the game. In 2015, he provided the voice for an award-winning satirical anti-war film by the UK branch of Veterans for Peace called Action Man: Battlefield Casualties.

Since 2019, Berry has narrated adverts for Moneysupermarket.com and also voices inserts for Absolute Radio.

In 2019, Berry provided the voice of Moominpappa in the popular Finnish animated children's series Moominvalley.

Berry also provides the voice for the torture droid 8D8 in the 2021 Star Wars television series The Book of Boba Fett.

Music
Berry composed all the music for Snuff Box and Toast of London, as well as the music for AD/BC: A Rock Opera, which he co-wrote with Richard Ayoade. AD/BC was a half-hour parody of overblown musicals in general and Jesus Christ Superstar in particular, telling the story of the innkeeper who allowed Mary, Joseph, and the baby Jesus to sleep in his manger. AD/BC was broadcast in December 2004 and featured Fulcher and Mighty Boosh stars Julian Barratt and Noel Fielding. Berry also performed a song for an episode of Garth Marenghi's Darkplace, "One Track Lover", a spoof of cheesy romantic 1980s songs.

Berry also wrote music for the BBC 2 Steve Coogan comedy Saxondale and appeared in the first and third episodes of the second series of the show. He composed the theme song for the Channel 4 sketch show Blunder. He is also credited on The Peter Serafinowicz Show.

Berry is friends with musical composer Dan McGrath and contributed to the Strictly Come Dancing theme song by playing guitar and providing the audible "Hey".

Berry has recorded nine studio albums: Jackpot (1995), Opium (self-released, 2008), Witchazel (2011), Kill the Wolf (2013), Music for Insomniacs (2014), The Small Hours (2016), Television Themes (2018), Phantom Birds (2020) and The Blue Elephant (2021). The most recent five have been released on Eddie Piller's Acid Jazz Records. In 2017, a "companion piece" to The Small Hours was released, Night Terrors, featuring remixes by artists such as Saint Etienne. Berry stated in the first issue of Bearded Magazine in 2007 that he was producing and collaborating on new material with 1960s soul singer Geno Washington and would record a new album. followed by a cover of the Blur song "Sing" in November 2007. "Cream Pie" is still available to supporters of Beardaid.

Berry voiced his appreciation of the television themes of Ronnie Hazlehurst in an episode of Charlie Brooker's Screenwipe, and his band played out the Screenwipe Christmas special with a rendition of Hazlehurst's theme tune for 1980s British sitcom Sorry!

Until 2010, Berry presented a show on Absolute Radio, where he still performs various voiceovers and was described as "the voice of Absolute Radio". The now-defunct Matt Berry Podcast regularly featured in the Top Ten of the iTunes podcast chart, and its producer Vince Lynch was nominated for Best Online Producer at the Radio Production Awards.

In 2012, part of the Snuff Box theme appeared briefly in the film Dredd, with the line "but it was bronze" playing from a computer terminal in the Grand Hall of Justice in the latter half of the film.

In 2015, Berry was the opening act for Steven Wilson's second Royal Albert Hall concert.

In July 2018, Berry released the album Television Themes on Acid Jazz Records, featuring covers of famous retro TV themes such as Sorry!, Doctor Who and Rainbow. It became his first UK Top 40 album chart hit.

In 2019, Berry was revealed as one of the contributing artists on the Desert Sessions album Vols. 11 & 12. He co-wrote, narrated, and played the organ on the track "Chic Tweetz".

In October 2020, Berry's album Phantom Birds (also issued by Acid Jazz) made the UK albums chart and eclipsed the number 38 peak of Television Themes by reaching number 31. In December 2020, he appeared in Gorillaz's livestreamed concert Song Machine Live, performing the narration for the spoken-word song "Fire Coming Out of the Monkey's Head".

On 14 May 2021, Berry released his ninth studio album, The Blue Elephant, distributed by Acid Jazz.

Music videos 
Berry has appeared in several music videos. He starred in the video for the Super Furry Animals song "Run-Away" (2007), directed by Richard Ayoade. Other appearances include the videos for "Reset" (2011) by London-based experimental band Three Trapped Tigers and "What Are You Like" (2017) by Irish band Pugwash.

Filmography

Film

Television

Discography

Awards and nominations

References

External links 

 
 
 BBC biography
 Matt Berry at the British Film Institute

1974 births
Living people
Alumni of Nottingham Trent University
Best Male Comedy Performance BAFTA Award (television) winners
British male comedy actors
English male film actors
English male musicians
English male television actors
British male television writers
English male voice actors
English soap opera writers
English television producers
English television writers
Male actors from Bedfordshire
People from the Borough of Bedford
20th-century English male actors
21st-century English male actors
Acid Jazz Records artists